The Revelation is a 1986 remix album by rock band Daniel Amos, released on Frontline Records.

The Revelation is a reworking of the popular "side 2" of the band's 1977 album, Shotgun Angel. All of the tracks were remixed, and one new song was recorded, the Phil Spector inspired "Soon". Also, added for this new collection were narrations between songs by Calvary Chapel Pastor Chuck Smith, reading from the Book of Revelation.

Track listing
 "Finale: Bereshith Overture" (Stipech/Taylor/Chamberlain/Cook) 6:03
 "Lady Goodbye" (Taylor/Chamberlain/Cook) 3:59
 "The Whistler" (Taylor/Chamberlain/Cook) 5:23
 "He's Gonna Do a Number On You" (Cook) 2:28
 "Better" (Taylor/Chamberlain/Cook) 6:48
 "Sail Me Away" (Taylor/Chamberlain) 6:28
 "Posse In the Sky" (Taylor) 6:23
 "Soon" (Taylor) 11:02
Track times include narrations between songs

The band
 Terry Scott Taylor – rhythm guitars and lead vocals
 Ed McTaggart – drums
 Jerry Chamberlain – guitar
 Mark Cook – keyboards
 Marty Dieckmeyer – bass guitar
 Tim Chandler – bass guitar ("Soon")
 Greg Flesch – guitar ("Soon")
 Rob Watson – keyboards ("Soon" and incidental music)

References 

Daniel Amos albums
1986 remix albums